Dustin Aaron Moskovitz (born May 22, 1984) is an American Internet entrepreneur who co-founded Facebook, Inc. (now known as Meta) with Mark Zuckerberg, Eduardo Saverin, Andrew McCollum and Chris Hughes. In 2008, he left Facebook to co-found Asana with Justin Rosenstein. In March 2011, Forbes reported Moskovitz to be the youngest self-made billionaire in the world, on the basis of his 2.34% share in Facebook. As of November 2022, his net worth is estimated at US$11.3 billion.

Early life
Moskovitz was born in Gainesville, Florida and grew up in Ocala, Florida. He is Jewish. He attended Vanguard High School, graduating from the IB Diploma Program. Moskovitz attended Harvard University as an economics major for two years before he moved with Mark Zuckerberg to Palo Alto in order to work full-time on Facebook.

Career

Facebook (2004-2008)
Four people, three of whom were roommates—Mark Zuckerberg, Eduardo Saverin, Chris Hughes, and Dustin Moskovitz—founded Facebook in their Harvard University dorm room in February 2004. Originally called thefacebook.com, it was intended as an online directory of all Harvard's students to help residential students identify members of other residences. In June 2004, Zuckerberg, Hughes and Moskovitz took a year off from Harvard and moved Facebook's base of operations to Palo Alto, California, and hired eight employees. They were later joined by Sean Parker. At Facebook, Moskovitz was the company's first chief technology officer and then vice president of engineering.

Asana (2008- ) 
On October 3, 2008, Moskovitz announced that he was leaving Facebook to form a new company called Asana with Justin Rosenstein, an engineering manager at Facebook. Asana's mission is to improve the efficiency of office workers, providing them with a tool to manage and track projects and tasks. Moskowitz has remained CEO, with Rosenstein now serving as Board Member and Advisor. In September 2020, Asana went public at a market value of about $5.5 billion in a direct listing. As of 2021, Asana has more than 107,000 paying customers.

Philanthropy

Moskovitz co-founded the philanthropic organization Good Ventures with his girlfriend (and now wife) Cari Tuna in 2011. In June 2012, Good Ventures announced a close partnership with charity evaluator GiveWell. Both organizations "are aiming to do as much good as possible" and thereby align with the goals of effective altruism. Good Ventures has donated approximately $100 million from 2011 onward to GiveWell top charities Against Malaria Foundation, GiveDirectly, Schistosomiasis Control Initiative, and Deworm the World Initiative, as well as standout charities (see Good Ventures for more) and other effective altruist organizations.

The collaboration with GiveWell led to a spinoff called the Open Philanthropy Project, whose goal is to figure out the best possible way to use large sums of money (starting with Moskovitz's multi-billion-dollar fortune) to do the best. The Open Philanthropy Project has since become a separate organization, and continuously increases its annual giving, having made over $170 million in grants in 2018 alone (see Open Philanthropy Project#Grants made for more). Moskowitz is a supporter of using rationality to guide his decision-making.

Moskovitz and Tuna are also the youngest couples to sign Bill Gates and Warren Buffett's Giving Pledge, which commits billionaires to give away most of their wealth in the form of philanthropy.

Politics 
Moskovitz has voted for the Democratic Party candidates in each election in which he has voted, but he wrote: "Though we've voted for the Democratic nominee each of the times we've cast a ballot, we've considered ourselves independent thinkers who respect candidates and positions from both sides of the aisle." Prior to their donation for the 2016 election cycle, Moskovitz and Tuna had donated roughly $10,000 over their lifetime to federal candidates, most of it to Sean Eldridge, the husband of Facebook co-founder Chris Hughes.

Moskovitz, through his support of the Open Philanthropy Project, has contributed to California YIMBY. The Open Philanthropy Project, mainly funded by Moskovitz and his wife, has donated around $500,000 to the cause.

For the 2016 United States presidential election, Moskovitz announced that he and his wife would donate $20 million to support Hillary Clinton, the Democratic Party nominee, arguing that the dangers of a Donald Trump presidency are significant, and that they were making their donation despite being skeptical of allowing large donors to influence election cycles through money. The New York Times quoted Moskovitz's blog post on the subject: "The Republican Party, and Donald Trump in particular, is running on a zero-sum vision, stressing a false contest between their constituency and the rest of the world." This made him the third-largest donor in the 2016 campaigns.

For the 2020 United States presidential election, Moskovitz donated $24 million to support the Democratic Party nominee Joe Biden. Asana's own listed contributions for the election cycle, which are almost all directly from Moskovitz and his wife Cari Tuna, reached around $45 million. This makes Asana the second largest contributor to Biden's presidential campaign after Bloomberg LP.

Other business activities
Moskovitz was also the biggest angel investor in the mobile photo-sharing site Path, run by another former member of Facebook, David Morin. It was reported that Moskovitz's advice was important in persuading Morin to reject a $100 million offer for the company from Google, made in February 2011. In 2020, Moskovitz led a $40 million dollar Series D funding round for fusion power start-up Helion Energy.

Personal life
Moskovitz met Cari Tuna on a blind date, and they married in 2013. Moskovitz is Jewish.

Moskovitz and Tuna attend Burning Man regularly, and Moskovitz has written about his reasons for doing so.

Media depictions
Moskovitz is played in the movie The Social Network by actor Joseph Mazzello. Responding to a question on Quora, Moskovitz said that the film "emphasizes things that didn't matter (like the Winklevoss brothers, whom I've still never even met and had no part in the work we did to create the site over the past 6 years) and leaves out things that did (like the many other people in our lives at the time, who supported us in innumerable ways)."

References

Further reading

External links

1984 births
 Living people
20th-century American Jews
21st-century American Jews
21st-century philanthropists
 American billionaires
 American computer businesspeople
 American technology company founders
Businesspeople from Florida
 Facebook employees
 Giving Pledgers
 Harvard University alumni
 Jewish American philanthropists
 People associated with effective altruism
 People from Gainesville, Florida